Mumbai South Central Lok Sabha constituency (formerly, Bombay South  Central Lok Sabha constituency) is one of the 48 Lok Sabha (parliamentary) constituencies in Maharashtra state in western India.

Assembly segments
Presently, after the implementation of the Presidential notification on delimitation on 19 February 2008, Mumbai South Central Lok Sabha constituency comprises six Vidhan Sabha (legislative assembly) segments. These segments are

Members of Parliament

Election results

1999

2004

2009

2014

2019

See also
 Mumbai
 List of Constituencies of the Lok Sabha

References

External links
 Mumbai South Central Candidate Affidavits
Mumbai South-Central lok sabha  constituency election 2019 results details

Politics of Mumbai
Lok Sabha constituencies in Maharashtra
Lok Sabha constituencies in Mumbai